Rise Up New York! was a virtual hour-long telethon organized by the Robin Hood Foundation and iHeartMedia on May 11, 2020, aimed to support the residents of New York who had been heavily impacted by the COVID-19 pandemic in the United States. Hosted by actress Tina Fey, the event was broadcast across numerous New York-based television and radio stations and featured appearances from many prominent celebrities residing in the state.

Overview 
The telethon's purpose was to raise awareness and relief funds for those affected by the COVID-19 pandemic in the state of New York, which in the spring of 2020 had more cases of COVID-19 than any other US state. The donations were used to help provide food, shelter, health, education, and other services to those in need. While host Tina Fey presented the event live from 30 Rockefeller Plaza, almost every other element of the special was prerecorded. The event raised over $115 million in funds.

Musical performances 
Many artists and musicians performed during this event. Those that performed were:

Appearances 
Many celebrities, politicians, and other notable figures appeared throughout the telethon. Notable figures who made appearances during this event were:

 Robert De Niro
 Jessica Chastain
 Jennifer Lopez
 Spike Lee
 Michael Strahan
 Eli Manning
 Phil Simms
 Justin Tuck
 Sarah Jessica Parker
 Matthew Broderick
 Barbra Streisand
 Patti LuPone
 Audra McDonald
 Bette Midler
 Bill de Blasio (Mayor of New York City)
 Jake Gyllenhaal
 Trevor Noah
 David Chang
 Angie Mar
 Daniel Humm
 Danny Meyer
 Jimmy Fallon
 Awkwafina
 Chris Rock
 Mike D
 Rosie Perez
 Ad-Rock
 Darryl McDaniels
 Fab Five Freddy
 RZA
 Salt-N-Pepa
 Michael Bloomberg
 Andrew Cuomo (Governor of New York)

Broadcast 
The telethon was broadcast from 7pm to 8pm ET. On television, it was broadcast across the United States by CNBC, Cheddar, CNN, MTV2, MTV Classic, and MTV Live. It was also simulcast on all local broadcast television stations in New York, including WABC (ABC), WCBS (CBS), WNBC (NBC), WNYW (Fox), WWOR-TV (MyNetworkTV), WPIX (The CW), and WLNY (Independent). It was also broadcast on several New York-based regional cable channels such as MSG Network, News 12 Networks, NY1, SportsNet New York, and YES Network.

On radio, it was broadcast nationally by Sirius XM and locally on all New York-based radio stations owned by iHeartMedia and Entercom, including WHTZ (Z100), WLTW (106.7 Lite FM), WWPR-FM (Power 105.1), WAXQ (Q104.3), WKTU (104.5 KTU), WOR, WCBS-AM (WCBS Newsradio 880), WCBS-FM (101.1 CBS-FM), WFAN-AM/FM (Sports Radio 66 and 101.9), WINS-AM (1010 WINS), WNEW-FM (NEW 102.7), WNSH (New York's Country 94.7), and WNYL (ALT 92.3).

Online, it was simulcast by ABC News Live, AMC.com, Facebook, LiveXLive, NBC News Now, and NowThis News.

References

External links
 
 

American telethons
Charity events in the United States
COVID-19 pandemic benefit concerts
2020 television specials